The 2016 Daventry District Council election took place on 5 May 2016 to elect members of Daventry District Council in England. This was on the same day as other local elections.

Only one seat changed hands with Labour taking one seat from the Conservatives leading to the council being made up as follows; 30 Conservative councillors, 3 Labour councillors, 2 UKIP councillors and 1 Liberal Democrat councillor.

This was the first year in which the Liberal Democrats, along with the Conservatives and Labour party, stood in all 12 wards.

Election result

Ward results

Abbey North

Abbey South

Barby & Kilsby

Braunston & Welton

Brixworth

Drayton

Hill

Long Buckby

Ravensthorpe

Spratton

Weedon

Woodford

References

2016 English local elections
2016
2010s in Northamptonshire